Lean Times in Lankhmar is a novel by Fritz Leiber published by White Wolf in 1996.

Plot summary
Lean Times in Lankhmar is White Wolf's second volume of Fafhrd and the Gray Mouser stories.

Reception
Jonathan Palmer reviewed Lean Times in Lankhmar for Arcane magazine, rating it an 8 out of 10 overall. Palmer comments that "These stories have been very influential on late 20th century fantasy writing and the development of roleplaying. It is what happens in the land of Newhon (and places beyond) that makes fantasy fun, and makes people think that fantasy gaming might be fun, too."

Reviews
Review by uncredited (1999) in Vector 208

References

1996 American novels
White Wolf Publishing